A swim ring (also known as a swimming ring, swim tube, rubber ring, water donut, floatie, inner tube, or, in the United States, a lifesaver) is a toroid-shaped (hence the name "ring" or "doughnut") inflatable water toy. The swim ring was derived from the inner tube, the inner, enclosed, inflatable part of older vehicle tires. The inner tube, when inflated, was used as a water toy, and as a floating object to lounge on.

The swim ring is not designed to save individuals from drowning.

Structure
A swim ring consists of two identically-sized layers of flat plastic, one of which contains a valve. The shape of each layer is like a large circle with a smaller, concentric circle removed. The two layers are joined at their inner and outer edges, sealing an air chamber inside.

Swim rings (also called "swimming rings", "swimrings", "inner tubes", "innertubes", "rubber rings" or "floaty/floaties") are inflated with air and worn around the user's torso, usually just under the arms or sat upon, to hold the user above the water. They come in a variety of sizes to fit children through adults, though the larger sizes are often called "swim tubes" or just "tubes".

Classic variants of the swim ring include the ever-popular animal-shaped rings, which sometimes include an additional air chamber in the shape of a forward-facing animal head on the upper side of the ring. It may be either an air chamber that directly communicates with the ring, or an independent air chamber with its own contained valve, and a variety of colorful shapes and designs have been produced over the time, ranging from popular characters to water-related animals (flamingos, swans, sea creatures...) or otherwise, and even fantasy creatures such as dragons and unicorns, sometimes featuring additional chambers besides the head one to represent limbs, tails, wings, etc. Although usually small and mostly popular among children, these animal-shaped swim rings have also started appearing in much larger, adult-size designs since 2015, also proving to be extremely popular, even by adults after many famous personalities posted pictures with those toys on social media.

There are also variant forms of tubes like boat and fish available. Other swim ring designs include baby swim neck rings.

Use

At water parks, these are commonly used on water slides, with a person sitting in the center of the ring, legs and body leaning over the sides. Some designs even appear as more than one tube sewn together, and include 2 or 4 holes so that more than one rider can fit comfortably.

See also

 Air mattress
 Beach
 Inflatable armbands
 Inner tube
 Lifebuoy
 List of inflatable manufactured goods
 Personal flotation device
 Swimming float

External links

Inflatable manufactured goods
Physical activity and dexterity toys
Swimming equipment
Water toys